Carlos David Valdes (born April 20, 1989) is a Colombian-American actor and singer. He is best known for his role as Cisco Ramon / Vibe on The CW television series The Flash and other Arrowverse-related projects.

Early life
Valdes was born in Cali, Colombia and raised in Miami, Florida by the age of 5, then moved again to Marietta, Georgia at the age of 12. He studied at the University of Michigan with Darren Criss and other actors from the theater group StarKid Productions, and co-wrote their 2009 musical Me and My Dick. Additionally he played the bass for that show as well as for A Very Potter Musical, and was featured on the track "A Thousand and One Nights (Pop Version)" which played during the end credits of Twisted and appeared on the cover album Twisted: Twisted.

After graduating in 2011, Valdes became entirely devoted to theater. Between 2009 and 2011, he participated in theatrical productions like High School Musical and The Wedding Singer. He also was a stand-in in the national tour of Jersey Boys. From March 2013 to March 2014, he played the role of Andrej in the musical Once, in which he also performed on piano, guitar, ukulele, bass, and percussion.

Career
In 2014, Valdes made his television debut in the American series Arrow, before appearing in the spin-off series, The Flash, as a series regular in the role of Francisco "Cisco" Ramón, an engineering genius. Cisco is part of the S.T.A.R. Labs team, along with Dr. Harrison Wells and Dr. Caitlin Snow, that help Barry Allen with his superpowers. Ramon is later revealed to have metahuman powers of his own, and takes on the moniker Vibe. Valdes also played other versions of Ramon: his Earth-2 doppelganger, who goes by Reverb; Pablo, a waiter in the season 3 episode "Duet"; and his Earth-19 doppelganger, who goes by Echo. Valdes also voiced the character in the animated spin-off web series Vixen. Valdes exited The Flash as a regular cast member after its seventh season.

Valdes also works as a songwriter, instrumentalist, and recording artist. In 2015, he independently released the EP Night Off, under his music pseudonym Tha Los.

Filmography

Theater

References

External links 

 

1989 births
Living people
American male stage actors
American male television actors
American male voice actors
Colombian expatriates in the United States
Colombian male actors
Colombian male stage actors
Colombian male television actors
Colombian male voice actors
Expatriate male actors in the United States
Hispanic and Latino American male actors
Male actors from Georgia (U.S. state)
People from Cobb County, Georgia
People with acquired American citizenship
StarKid Productions members
University of Michigan School of Music, Theatre & Dance alumni
21st-century American male actors
21st-century Colombian male actors
21st-century Colombian male singers